Dr. Robert Fox (born 7 October 1938) MA, DPhil, FSA FRHistS is a leading British authority on the history of science. He is interested in the history of sciences and technology in Europe from the 18th century onwards. He has published extensively. His book The Savant and the State examines science, culture and politics in France between 1814 and 1914, while Science without Frontiers examines developments from the late nineteenth-century until the Second World War. In 2015, Fox received the George Sarton Medal, the premier award of the international History of Science Society (HSS). He was recognized as a Chevalier of the Ordre des Arts et des Lettres by France's Ministry of Culture in 2006.

Education
Robert Fox attended the Imperial College of Science and Technology at the University of London from 1957–1958, followed by Oriel College, Oxford.  He received a BA (Oxon) in Physics in 1961, an MA (Oxon) in 1965, and a D.Phil. (Oxon) from the Faculty of Modern History in 1967, supervised by Alistair Cameron Crombie.  His thesis was The study of the thermal properties of gases in relation to physical theory from  Montgolfier to Regnault.

Career
Robert Fox taught at the University of Lancaster between 1966 and 1988, first as a lecturer and later as professor of the History of Science.

Between 1986 and 1988, Fox was director of research at the Centre de recherche en histoire des sciences et des techniques (CRHST) at the Cité des sciences et de l'industrie in Paris, and assistant director of the Science Museum, London.

In 1988, Fox became a professor of history of science at the University of Oxford; retiring from that position in 2006.  Fox is now an Emeritus Professor of the history of science at the University of Oxford, England, an Emeritus Fellow of Linacre College and an Honorary Fellow of Oriel College.  He was succeeded as chair of the history of science by Pietro Corsi.

Fox was the first organizer of the annual Thomas Harriot Lectures at Oriel College, Oxford. He has edited two volumes based on the lecture series: Thomas Harriot. An Elizabethan Man of Science (2000) and Thomas Harriot and His World. Mathematics, Exploration, and Natural Philosophy in Early Modern England (2012).

Since 2006, Fox has been a visiting professor at Johns Hopkins University, East Carolina University, the Czech Technical University in Prague, the Horning Visiting Scholar at Oregon State University (2013), and the Gordon Cain Distinguished Fellow at the Chemical Heritage Foundation in Philadelphia (2013).

Fox was the founding president of the European Society for the History of Science, which was founded on 12 October 2003. Fox has also served as  president of the British Society for the History of Science and the International Union of History and Philosophy of Science.

Between 2008 and 2014, Fox edited Notes and Records: the Royal Society Journal of the History of Science.

Fox has appeared on the BBC radio program In Our Time, discussing the work of the Curie family: Marie and Pierre Curie, their daughter Irène Joliot-Curie and her husband Frédéric Joliot-Curie.

Awards and honors
 2015, George Sarton Medal, the premier award of the international History of Science Society (HSS)
 2015, Alexandre Koyré Medal
 2006, Chevalier of the Ordre des Arts et des Lettres, French Ministry of Culture
 2004, Oskar von Miller Gold Medal, Deutsches Museum, Munich
 1998, Dickinson Medal of the Newcomen Society for the History of Technology
 1989, Elected as Fellow of the Society of Antiquaries of London
 1988, Chevalier in the Ordre des Palmes Académiques
 1986, Honorary Doctorate from Heriot-Watt University
 1986, Full Member of the International Academy of the History of Science (Académie Internationale d’Histoire des Sciences)
 1981, Corresponding member of the Académie Internationale d’Histoire des Sciences
 1974, Fellow of the Royal Historical Society

Bibliography

Fox has published extensively as an author, editor and contributor. Some of his works include: 
 
 
 
 
 
 
 
 
 
 
 
 Science without Frontiers: Cosmopolitanism and National Interests in the World of Learning, 1870–1940,  Oregon State University Press, to appear 2016

References

1938 births
Living people
Fellows of Linacre College, Oxford
20th-century English historians
21st-century British historians
20th-century biographers
21st-century biographers
Historians of the United Kingdom
Fellows of the Royal Historical Society
Chevaliers of the Ordre des Arts et des Lettres
Fellows of the Society of Antiquaries of London